Parts is an Estonian surname, and may refer to:
 Juhan Parts (born 1966), Estonian politician
 Kaarel Parts (1873–1940), Estonian lawyer and politician
 Karl Parts (1886–1941), Estonian military officer

References

Estonian-language surnames